The Swift Show is an American variety/game show that aired on Thursdays at 8:30pm EST on NBC premiering April 1, 1948 and running to 1949.

Overview
The series, sponsored by the Swift & Company meat packing company, was mainly a musical variety show hosted by Lanny Ross, although during its first few months, it also featured a quiz show segment. Guest stars included Eileen Barton, Frank Fontaine, Max Showalter, and Susan Shaw.

For the first five months, a quiz show segment was included. In September 1948, the show became "Lanny's penthouse with his girlfriend Eileen Barton visiting". In March 1949, the show reverted to a purely musical variety show.

Episode status
Two episodes, from May 13, 1948 and May 27, 1948, are in the collection of the UCLA Film and Television Archive, and an episode from March 31, 1949 is in the collection of the Paley Center for Media.

See also
1948-49 United States network television schedule
The Swift Home Service Club

References

External links
 

1948 American television series debuts
1949 American television series endings
1940s American variety television series
Black-and-white American television shows
NBC original programming
English-language television shows